Adams Glacier may refer to:

Adams Glacier (Mount Adams), Washington, US
Adams Glacier (Wilkes Land), Antarctica
Adams Glacier (Victoria Land), Antarctica
Adams Glacier (New Zealand)